{{Infobox album
| name       = Hoppa and Friends| type       = Studio album
| artist     = DJ Hoppa
| cover      =
| alt        =
| released   = March 31, 2015
| recorded   = 2014
| venue      =
| studio     =
| genre      = Hip hop
| length     = 33:56
| label      = Funk Volume, Broken Complex
| producer   = DJ Hoppa
| prev_title =
| prev_year  =
| next_title =
| next_year  =
}}Hoppa and Friends''''' is the debut studio album by DJ Hoppa, released on March 31, 2015, by Funk Volume and Broken Complex Records. Production is done completely by Hoppa along with a few additional producers such as SwizZz. The album contains multiple guest appearances from various underground rappers, such as the entire Funk Volume roster (Hopsin, SwizZz, Dizzy Wright and Jarren Benton), Demrick, R.A. the Rugged Man, Chris Webby and more.

Track listing

2015 debut albums
Hip hop albums by American artists